Mezoneuron is a genus of flowering plants in the legume family, Fabaceae. It belongs to the subfamily Caesalpinioideae and the tribe Caesalpinieae.

Characteristics and distribution
This genus consists of lianas, often with the characteristic 'cat's claw' spines on their stems.  Pods are one or more seeded, with a longitudinal (often narrow) wing along the upper suture and a wing 2 mm or more wide, which may be papery, coriaceous or woody.  They may be found in Africa, Madagascar and SE Asia across the Malay Peninsula and Archipelago to New Guinea, New Caledonia and Australia, one species endemic to Hawaii.

Species
Mezoneuron comprises the following species:
 Mezoneuron andamanicum Prain
 Mezoneuron angolense Welw. ex Oliv.
 Mezoneuron baudouinii Guillaumin
 Mezoneuron benthamianum Baill.
 Mezoneuron brachycarpum Benth.
 Mezoneuron cucullatum (Roxb.) Wight & Arn.
 Mezoneuron enneaphyllum (Roxb.) Wight & Arn. ex Voigt
 Mezoneuron erythrocarpum (Pedley) R. Clark & E. Gagnon
 Mezoneuron furfuraceum Prain

 Mezoneuron hildebrandtii Vatke
 Mezoneuron hymenocarpum Wight & Arn. ex Prain
 Mezoneuron kauaiense (H. Mann) Hillebr.—Uhiuhi (synonym M. kavaiense - Hawaii)
 Mezoneuron latisiliquum (Cav.) Merr.
 Mezoneuron mindorense Merr.
 Mezoneuron montrouzieri Guillaumin
 Mezoneuron nhatrangense Gagnep. (Vietnam)
 Mezoneuron nitens (F. Muell. ex Benth.) R. Clark & E. Gagnon
 Mezoneuron ouenensis (Guillaumin) R. Clark
 Mezoneuron pubescens Desf.
 Mezoneuron rubiginosum (Guillaumin) R. Clark
 Mezoneuron sinense Hemsl.
 Mezoneuron schlechteri (Harms) R. Clark
 Mezoneuron scortechinii F. Muell.
 Mezoneuron sumatranum (Roxb.) Wight & Arn. (Malesia, Indochina)

Fossils
The following fossils have been described:
 †Mezoneuron claibornensis (Herendeen & Dilcher) R. Clark & E. Gagnon
 †Mezoneruon flumen-viridensis (Herendeen & Dilcher) R. Clark & E. Gagnon
 †Mezoneuron spokanensis (Knowlton) R. Clark & E. Gagnon

References

External links
 
 

Caesalpinieae
Fabaceae genera
Fabales of Asia